SEK Class Δα (or Class Da; Delta-alpha) was a class of twenty 0-6-0T steam locomotives of the Hellenic State Railways in Greece. These were ex-United States Army Transportation Corps (USATC) S100 Class.  They were delivered to SEK in 1946-1947 and were numbered Δα51-70. Eight have survived the steam scrappings of the 1980s.

See also
 USATC S100 Class

References

Δα
USATC S100
0-6-0T locomotives
Steam locomotives of Greece
Railway locomotives introduced in 1946
Davenport locomotives
H. K. Porter locomotives
Vulcan Iron Works locomotives
Standard gauge locomotives of Greece

Shunting locomotives